Joseph Thomas "Joe" Smitherman (December 24, 1929 – September 11, 2005) was an American politician who served more than 35 years as mayor of Selma, Alabama. He was in office during the Selma to Montgomery marches of the Civil Rights Movement.

Life and career

Smitherman was born in Alberta, Alabama. His family moved to Selma, where he graduated from high school. Smitherman worked as a railroad brakeman before joining the United States Army during the Korean War. Upon discharge, he opened a home appliance store. In 1960, he won a seat on the Selma City Council. He was elected mayor in 1964. He resigned in 1979 and was succeeded by Council President Carl Morgan (d. 2006). A year later he returned to office, defeating Mayor Morgan in a three-way race. He served five more terms until the 2000 mayoral elections, when he lost to James Perkins, Jr., Selma's first African American mayor, who ran under the slogan "Joe's Got To Go".

In his early political career in the 1960s. he was in favor of segregation, and controversially referred to Martin Luther King Jr. as "Martin Luther Coon" in a 1965 televised interview. He explained it as a slip of the tongue. After African Americans gained voting rights, he appointed several African Americans officials to high municipal offices. He gained enough support among the African American population to remain in office. He proudly referred to his significant support in the African American community.

At the time of the Selma march he was considered a moderate and not close to Judge James Hare or to Sheriff Jim Clark. who ordered and carried out the police operation against marchers. Smitherman ordered city police to use force against the protesters, but the order was disobeyed by the safety director, Wilson Baker. Before the marches, he had rejected the possibility of forming a biracial reconciliation committee.

He later stated that he had always been racially tolerant and that it was only the political climate around him that required him to work against the civil rights movement but that he had really been in favor of change.

Death
At the time of his death, Smitherman was recuperating from hip surgery and had heart problems. The Joseph T. Smitherman Historic Building in Selma is named in his honor.

References

1929 births
2005 deaths
20th-century American politicians
Alabama city council members
United States Army personnel of the Korean War
Mayors of places in Alabama
Politicians from Selma, Alabama
People from Wilcox County, Alabama